Kristi Racines (born c. 1983) is an American politician from the state of Wyoming. She is the Wyoming State Auditor.

Early life and career
Racines was born in Casper, Wyoming, and raised in Riverton. She graduated from the University of Wyoming with a bachelor's degree in accounting and Spanish. She is a certified public accountant and worked as the chief financial officer and director of human resources for the Wyoming Supreme Court Office of Court Administration, responsible for managing an $80 million budget.

Wyoming State Auditor
In the 2018 elections, Racines ran for Wyoming State Auditor. She defeated Nathan Winters in the primary election, and won the general election. She was sworn into office on January 7, 2019. Racines ran for reelection in the 2022 elections, and won a second term without opposition.

Personal life
Racines and her husband have two children and live in Cheyenne, Wyoming.

References

External links

1980s births
21st-century American politicians
Living people
Politicians from Casper, Wyoming
People from Riverton, Wyoming
State Auditors of Wyoming
University of Wyoming alumni
Wyoming Republicans
Women in Wyoming politics
21st-century American women politicians